Ibadan South-West is a Local Government Area in Oyo State, Nigeria. Its headquarters are at Oluyole Estate in Ibadan. Its areas or districts includes Ring-Road, Oke-Ado, Oke-Bola Gege, Born-Photo, and Isale-Osi.

It has an area of 40 km and a population of 282,585 at the 2006 census.

The postal code of the area is 200. and the postal address range from SW1 to SW12 depending on the ward.

References

Local Government Areas in Oyo State
Ibadan